Charles Joseph Adams (April 24, 1924 – March 23, 2011) was an American academic and professor of religion. He was Emeritus Professor of Islamic Studies at McGill University and for nearly 20 years the Director of the Institute of Islamic Studies there.

Life
Adams was born in Houston, Texas in 1924. His undergraduate education was at Baylor University, which was interrupted when he volunteered to serve in the Air Force during World War II as an airborne radio operator and mechanic. After the war he returned to Baylor to earn his B.A.

His long career at McGill University began when he joined the faculty in 1952. Adams the historian of religion turned his head more particularly toward Islam when, under a Ford Foundation Grant, he studied Islam in Pakistan. He returned to McGill to join the new Institute of Islamic Studies, and later served as its director from 1964–80.

Adams died on March 23, 2011 in Mesa, Arizona.

References

1924 births
2011 deaths
Academic staff of McGill University
American Islamic studies scholars
People from Houston
Baylor University alumni
United States Army Air Forces personnel of World War II
American expatriates in Canada